Ocaña, a town and municipality of central Spain, in the province of Toledo. It is located on the extreme north of the tableland known as the Mesa de Ocaña, and has a station on the railway from Aranjuez to Cuenca.

Toponymy 
The term Ocaña seems to have the base word  olca- that originates from the Celtiberian 'fertile ground, meadow', and could have evolved into: Olcania > Ocania < Ocaña. There are other theories, like the one by Nieto Ballester, who states that Ocaña is a pre-Roman term, maybe Indo-European, but not Celtic. On the other hand, Menéndez Pidal quotes the name of Ocaña to support his thesis of the Ligurian substratum in the Iberian Peninsula.

Geography 
This town is located on the north side of the plain known as Mesa de Ocaña, where you can find many towns of the region. It is close to other towns and cities as Aranjuez in the northeast, Ontígola in the north, Noblejas in the east, Villatobas in the southeast, Dosbarrios, Cabañas de Yepes and Huerta de Valdecarábanos in the south and Yepes and Ciruelos in the west.

History
The town is surrounded by ruined walls which contain the remains of an old castle. Ocaña is the Vicus Cuminarius of the Romans. The Battle of Ocaña was fought near here, on 19 November 1809; the Spanish under Juan Carlos de Aréizaga were routed by the French under Joseph Bonaparte and Marshal Soult.

Main sights
Convent of Santa Catalina de Siena, in Renaissance style
Convent of St. Dominic, in Renaissance style (1535–1605)
Fuente Grande ("Great Spring"), built in the 16th century
Fuente Vieja ("Old Spring"), probably of Roman origins
Parish church of Santa María de la Asunción, built over a 12th-century mosque
Parish church of St. John the Baptist (13th century)
Convent of the Carmelites (16th century)
Palacio de los Cárdenas (16th century)
Rollo de Justicia (15th century)

Transportation

Ocaña is a major hub in the Spanish motorway network. The autovías A-4 and A-40 and toll roads R-4 and AP-36 all intersect each other at Ocaña. In addition, the Madrid–Levante high-speed rail line passes by Ocaña, but does not have a station there.

References

Municipalities in the Province of Toledo